Ronald Jay Black (born May 26, 1958) is an American professional golfer who has played on the PGA Tour, Nationwide Tour and Champions Tour.

Black was born in Lovington, New Mexico. He attended Lamar University in Beaumont, Texas, where he was a member of the golf team. He turned pro in 1981.

Black won two events on the PGA Tour during his career both in the mid-1980s. He has more than $3 million in career earnings. His best finish in a major championship was T-6 at The Masters in 1984.

Black began playing on the Champions Tour in 2008. His best finish in his first two seasons was T-2 at the 2009 Dick's Sporting Goods Open.

Black was inducted into the Cardinal Hall of Honor at Lamar University in 1993. He lives in Tucson, Arizona.

Professional wins (4)

PGA Tour wins (2)

PGA Tour playoff record (1–1)

Other wins (2)
this list may be incomplete
1987 Arizona Open
1995 Pebble Beach Invitational

Results in major championships

Note: Black never played in The Open Championship.

CUT = missed the half-way cut
"T" = tied

Summary

Most consecutive cuts made – 5 (1986 PGA – 1997 PGA)
Longest streak of top-10s – 1

See also
Fall 1981 PGA Tour Qualifying School graduates
1982 PGA Tour Qualifying School graduates
1990 PGA Tour Qualifying School graduates
1994 PGA Tour Qualifying School graduates
1995 PGA Tour Qualifying School graduates

References

External links

American male golfers
Lamar Cardinals golfers
PGA Tour golfers
PGA Tour Champions golfers
Golfers from New Mexico
Golfers from Arizona
People from Lovington, New Mexico
Sportspeople from Tucson, Arizona
1958 births
Living people